Jan Bulis (born March 18, 1978) is a former Czech professional hockey winger who last played as the Captain of Traktor Chelyabinsk of the Kontinental Hockey League (KHL). He spent nine seasons in the National Hockey League (NHL), playing with the Washington Capitals, Montreal Canadiens, and Vancouver Canucks. The Capitals selected Bulis in the 1996 NHL Entry Draft.

Playing career
Bulis was drafted by the Washington Capitals in the 1996 NHL Entry Draft, Second Round, Forty-third Overall. Bulis was a fan favourite while playing for the Barrie Colts of the OHL and was among the top players in the OHL at that time from 1995–1997. In Bulis' top season for Barrie he accumulated 42 goals and 61 assists for a total of 103 points in 64 games. Unfortunately, that offensive potential did not show up in the NHL where he totalled of 251 points in 587 games played.

He has played for the Vancouver Canucks, Montreal Canadiens, Washington Capitals, AHL Portland Pirates, IHL Cincinnati Cyclones, OHL Kingston Frontenacs and Barrie Colts. On March 13 of 2001, Bulis was traded from the Washington Capitals along with Richard Zedník and a first round pick (Alexander Perezhogin) to the Montreal Canadiens for Dainius Zubrus, Trevor Linden and a second round draft pick (later traded to the Tampa Bay Lightning, who selected Andreas Holmqvist). During the 2004–05 NHL lockout, Bulis played for HC Pardubice in the Czech Republic Elite League. He scored 24 goals and had 25 assists in 45 games played. Bulis recorded his best NHL season in 2005–06 with Montreal where he scored 20 goals and 20 assists for 40 points in 73 games played. During the campaign in December 2005, Bulis was named to the Czech national ice hockey team for the 2006 Winter Olympics in Turin. It was the first time that Bulis played for the Czech National Team. On January 25, 2006 Bulis scored four goals in four shots against the Philadelphia Flyers.

Transactions
 June 22, 1996 - Drafted by the Washington Capitals in the 2nd round, 43rd overall.
 March 13, 2001 - Traded to the Montreal Canadiens along with Richard Zednik and a 1st round selection in the 2001 NHL Entry Draft (Alexander Perezhogin) in exchange for Trevor Linden, Dainius Zubrus, and a 2nd round selection in the 2001 NHL Entry Draft (previously acquired, later traded to the Tampa Bay Lightning - Andreas Holmqvist).
 July 25, 2006 - Signed as an unrestricted free agent by the Vancouver Canucks.
 On May 4, 2011 Bulis moved from KHL's Atlant Mytishchi to Traktor Chelyabinsk.
 April, 2012 - Signed one-year contract with Traktor Chelyabinsk.

Career statistics

Regular season and playoffs

International

References

External links
 
ESPN Sports
SI.com
Yahoo Sports

1978 births
Atlant Moscow Oblast players
Barrie Colts players
Czech ice hockey centres
Olympic ice hockey players of the Czech Republic
Czech expatriate ice hockey players in Russia
Ice hockey players at the 2006 Winter Olympics
Kelowna Spartans players
Kingston Frontenacs players
Living people
Montreal Canadiens players
Medalists at the 2006 Winter Olympics
Olympic bronze medalists for the Czech Republic
Olympic medalists in ice hockey
Sportspeople from Pardubice
Traktor Chelyabinsk players
Vancouver Canucks players
Washington Capitals draft picks
Washington Capitals players
Czech expatriate ice hockey players in Canada
Czech expatriate ice hockey players in the United States